Maria Brockerhoff (born 1942) is a retired German model, film and television actress.

Selected filmography
 Come to the Blue Adriatic (1966)
 Hotel Clausewitz (1967)
 Our Doctor is the Best (1969)
 Hugo, the Woman Chaser (1969)
 Hannibal Brooks (1969)

References

Bibliography

External links

1942 births
Living people
Actresses from Hamburg
German film actresses
German television actresses
German female models